George L. Crow Jr. was a member of the original Apple Macintosh team in 1984 at Apple Computer. Crow left Apple in 1985 to become a co-founder of Steve Jobs' NeXT. Prior to working at Apple, Crow worked at HP; after leaving NeXT he worked for SuperMac and then Truevision. In 1999, Crow came back to Apple, recalling that the general atmosphere was still similar to how it was in the 1980s. In 2006, he retired.

He received a B.S. degree from the University of California, Berkeley and his master's degree from Santa Clara University.

References

 George Crow talks Apple, then and now — March 24, 2004, MacMinute news story.

External links
 Board President of Music for Minors
 Opera San Jose, Board of Trustees, President
  Merola Opera Program, Board of Directors, Treasurer

Living people
UC Berkeley College of Engineering alumni
Santa Clara University alumni
Year of birth missing (living people)